Dames in de Dop 2 is the second season of Dames in de Dop, began on April 21, 2008. The winner, Michella Koxs, won €20,000 and a luxurious vacation.

Contestants
Daisy Ten Brink, 23, from Alkmaar, North Holland
Susanne Kroon, 18, from Assen, Drenthe (quit)
José Makkinga, 25, from Vroomshoop, Overijssel
Astrid Kemperman, 20, from Dronten, Flevoland
Sandy Schuring, 19, from Oostzaan, North Holland
Cherish Walden, 23, from The Hague, South Holland
Sharon Spronk, 20, from Utrecht, Utrecht
Nancy Janssen, 23, from The Hague, South Holland (runner-up)
Michella Koxs, 28, from Arnhem, Gelderland (winner)

Summaries

Call-out order

 The contestant won the reward challenge and quit the competition
 The contestant was eliminated
 The contestant won the competition

In the first episode, Astrid, Michella, Nancy and Sandy were exempted for elimination, because they had to do a speech.
In the second episode, Susanne quit the competition due to homesickness, therefore Astrid & José were saved for elimination.

Teachers
 Hendrik de Groot as protocol expert
 Coco de Meyere as image expert
 Anouk van Eekelen as etiquette expert
 Coen Winkelman as logopedic

External links
Official page at RTL

Dutch reality television series
2008 Dutch television seasons